The Republic is a 1998 Turkish historical film directed by Ziya Öztan.
The film follows the political and historical events of the first years of the Republic of Turkey (1922–1933) and looks at the private life of Mustafa Kemal Atatürk.

Cast
Rutkay Aziz as Mustafa Kemal Atatürk
Savaş Dinçel as İsmet İnönü
Hülya Aksular as Fikriye Hanım
Dolunay Soysert as Latife Hanım
Yeşim Alıç as Mevhibe İnönü
Ayda Aksel as Halide Edip Adıvar
Macide Tanır as Zübeyde Hanım
Tarık Günersel as Salih Bozok

References

External links 

1990s historical films
Turkish historical films
1990s Turkish-language films